Podgorica Royal Palace is a (former) royal winter residence in Podgorica, Montenegro. The palace was constructed by King Nikola I Petrović-Njegoš in 1889.

The palace is today the seat of the Petrovich Njegosh Foundation which is presided over by Nicholas, Crown Prince of Montenegro.

See also
Petrović-Njegoš dynasty

References

1889  establishments in Montenegro
Buildings and structures completed in 1889
Buildings and structures in Podgorica
Palaces in Montenegro
Royal residences in Montenegro